Ardhangini may refer to:
 Ardhangini (film), a 1959 Indian film
 Ardhangini (2007 TV series), or Ardhangani – Ek Khoobsurat Jeevan Saathi, a 2007–2008 Indian Hindi-language television series which aired on Zee TV
 Ardhangini (2017 TV series), a 2017–2018 Indian Assamese-language television series which aired on Rang
 Ardhangini (2018 TV series), a 2018 Indian Bengali-language television series airing on Star Jalsha